The 1997 Sacramento State Hornets football team represented California State University, Sacramento as a member of the Big Sky Conference during the 1997 NCAA Division I-AA football season. Led by third-year head coach John Volek, Sacramento State compiled an overall record of 1–10 with a mark of 1–7 in conference play, placing last out of nine teams in the Big Sky. The team was outscored by its opponents 408 to 188 for the season. The Hornets played home games at Hornet Stadium in Sacramento, California.

Schedule

References

Sacramento State
Sacramento State Hornets football seasons
Sacramento State Hornets football